Relic is a 1995 novel by American authors Douglas Preston and Lincoln Child, and the first in the Special Agent Pendergast series.  As a horror novel and techno-thriller, it comments on the possibilities inherent in genetic manipulation, and is critical of museums and their role both in society and in the scientific community.  It is the basis of the film The Relic (1997).

Plot

In September 1987, Dr. Julian Whittlesey is leading an expedition through the Amazon Basin, in the Brazilian rainforest, in search of the lost Kothoga tribe. He hopes to prove that they still do exist and in the process learn more about their culture, including their lizard god Mbwun ("He Who Walks On All Fours"), supposedly the son of Satan. However, Whittlesey disappears after finding the mutilated body of his partner, Crocker, and realizes that a creature in the bush is stalking him. A year later, in Belem, a dock worker named Ven is suddenly and brutally killed when a freighter arrives with a shipment of crates from Whittlesey's expedition.

Seven years later, in a fictionalized version of New York City's American Museum of Natural History, two young boys are found dead in a museum stairwell, having gotten lost in the late hours of the museum. NYPD Lieutenant Vincent D'Agosta leads the subsequent investigation. He has the museum under tight lockdown and its staff placed under curfew for fear the murderer is still hiding somewhere in the museum or the many catacombs that run underneath it. The three prominent leadership figures of the facility—curator Winston Wright, deputy head Ian Cuthbert, and public relations director Lavinia Rickman—all try to keep the murders under wraps, as the grand gala opening of the new "Superstition" exhibition, led by George Moriarty, draws nearer, an event that will feature many wealthy benefactors as well as Mayor Harper. Rickman even hires The New York Times reporter Bill Smithback, Jr. to cover the murder investigation but repeatedly edits his reports so they will appear more palatable towards the museum and its leadership. Assistant Curator Gregory Kawakita jokingly begins spreading the rumor of the "Museum Beast", a legendary monster that has allegedly been roaming the tunnels under the museum for years and is responsible for the murders. Although the rumors are initially dismissed as myth, D'Agosta is shocked during the autopsy when he discovers a claw buried in one of the boy's brains.

When a security guard suffers a similarly brutal death, FBI Special Agent Aloysius Pendergast arrives to aid in the investigation, having taken a personal interest in the unique nature of the kills. The investigation intensifies as the gala draws nearer, with the search spreading to the tunnels under the museum. Margo Green and her mentor, Dr. Whitney Frock, initially take little to no interest in the investigation, but Pendergast eventually approaches them when he realizes the claw from the autopsy matches the claws on a Mbwun figurine that had been sent back to the museum in a crate in 1987 and is set to be put on display in the new exhibition. Green, with Smithback's help, manages to get into the secure vault and gain access to some letters that Whittlesey had sent to a museum colleague named H.C. Montague, detailing the struggles experienced by the 1987 expedition. Pendergast then reveals the primary reason for his interest in the case: the nature of the murders of the two boys and the security guard matches the murder of the Brazilian dock worker in 1988, as well as several other dock workers in Louisiana later that year. Pendergast was able to trace back to the one connection among the museum murders, the Louisiana murder, and the Belem murder: the shipment of crates Whittlesey had sent the museum in 1987. However, other than one smaller crate containing the Mbwun figurine, the crates were empty, save massive quantities of local plant leaves seemingly used as packaging. Frock reveals that those crates have been moved into the heavily reinforced secure vault as well, and after Green and Smithback's stunt to get the letters, the directors are well aware of their intentions and will never allow them access to the crates. Pendergast hints at the possibility that the murders might not have been committed by a human, and that the Mbwun monster may somehow have been sent to the museum by Whittlesey's shipment.

Reading through more of Whittlesey's letters, Green and Smithback discover one other major colleague of Whittlesey's who is still working at the museum, and to whom one of the letters was addressed, Dr. Jorgensen. They ask Jorgensen about the nature of the expedition and its aftermath. Jorgensen explains that Whittlesey was determined to prove that the Kothoga tribe had not gone extinct, and that he had found it at long last on a tepui deep in the Brazilian jungle. In addition, Whittlesey had apparently discovered a unique plant at the base of the tepui that had some kind of protein-like quality to it. However, Whittlesey was being accompanied by a museum bureaucrat simply identified as "Maxwell", whose job was to hinder Whittlesey's progress so that the find would not interfere with the local government's discovery of an undisclosed natural resource that had been discovered on the tepui. Determined to mine the entire area, the government bombarded the tepui with napalm in 1988, killing all of the remaining Kothoga and destroying the plant. Jorgensen also reveals that Whittlesey's colleague Montague had disappeared rather suddenly several years ago. Green and Frock soon realize that the plant Whittlesey discovered was the same plant that had been sent back as packaging in the crates, and that Whittlesey had never sent the crates back to the museum empty; that the main content of the crates was the plant itself. The day of the gala, Green and Frock then begin running computer analyses on samples of the plant as well as the claw from the autopsy. The results reveal that the plants are rich in thalamoid hormones, which can also be found in the human hypothalamus gland, though to a much lesser extent. After reviewing the autopsy reports, Green realizes that what all of the murders - in the museum and in Louisiana and Brazil - all had in common was that the hypothalamus had been ripped out of the victim's heads and was completely missing. The analysis of the claw creates a general caricature of the creature in question, comprising a primary mix of primate, reptile, and human genes; a nocturnal nature; a strong sense of smell; a quadruped build; a maximum ground speed of 60-70 km/h (approximately 43.5 mph); and thick muscle definition and bone structure. Frock describes this hypothetical combination as having the strength of a grizzly bear, the speed of a greyhound, and the intelligence of a human being - the ultimate predator. Frock and Green finally discover the truth behind the entire ordeal, but their efforts to warn their superiors before the gala are thwarted.

As the investigation ultimately did not produce a suspect, the gala is allowed to begin, with combined forces from the NYPD and FBI providing a tightened security presence, under the official command of Special Agent Coffey. The exhibition initially appears to be going fine until the body of NYPD officer Fred Beauregard drops down from the rafters above the exhibition and right into the crowd, causing a mass panic. At the same time, an NYPD officer named Waters, assigned to monitor the museum's security control room, hears a strange noise in the generator room (later revealed to be simply the air conditioner pump) and opens fire; this inadvertent discharge completely destroys the central switching box and shuts down the museum's power. This in turn leads to the museum's massive, metal security doors automatically closing, separating the museum into five cells and trapping a group of civilians, personnel, and security guards/ law enforcement members alike inside the museum. When the chaos settles, dozens of people have either been killed by the stampeding crowd or crushed by the closing doors, and the roughly three dozen who are trapped inside the area where the exhibition is includes D'Agosta, Smithback, Cuthbert, Wright, Rickman, Mayor Harper, museum security director Ippolito, and NYPD officer John Bailey. Coffey and Kawakita manage to make it outside the museum. but Green, Frock, and Pendergast, who are all in the tunnels under the museum, soon encounter the creature. Pendergast manages to fire a single shot, which merely bounces off the creature's skull.

Pendergast manages to contact D'Agosta via radio, to warn him about the creature, and explains that the best way for the trapped crowd to escape is down through the museum tunnels, which eventually lead to the sewer systems of New York. The three directors refuse to head down into the tunnels, and instead retreat into Wright's office on the fourth floor. Just as D'Agosta prepares to lead the crowd down the first stairwell, the creature attacks, killing Ippolito and an injured guest. The rest of the crowd manages to escape down into the tunnels. Although extremely sceptical of the consistent reports of a creature's being responsible, Coffey eventually orders a SWAT team to descend into the museum through the skylights, to eliminate the creature. The Mbwun then enters the office where the three directors are hiding, and Cuthbert sends Rickman and a now-drunk Wright into the adjacent dinosaur area to safety, while he draws a pistol to make a stand. However, the creature inexplicably leaves him alone and pursues the other two, killing both of them. Cuthbert is rescued by the SWAT team shortly before they move in to attack the creature, only for the entire team to be slaughtered.

The crowd manages to navigate the tunnels and reaches the sewers just before the monster returns, killing Bailey. They then reach a massive underground chamber that is filled with skeletons and torn meat, presumably the creature's lair. They struggle to stay above the rising water as the storm outside intensifies, and another woman is dragged away by the current and dies, shortly before the crowd finally reaches a manhole and escapes back out onto the streets of New York. Pendergast and Green devise a plan to make a final stand against the creature, with Pendergast hoping to use his old hunting techniques of shooting the creature's legs in order to stop its charge. However, the shots fail to penetrate the hide, and the creature closes in. At the last second, Green shouts for Pendergast to shoot through the creature's eye, causing the bullet to pass straight through the skull and into the brain, which kills it instantly.

In the epilogue four weeks later, Green, Frock, Kawakita, Pendergast, D'Agosta, and Smithback all convene in Frock's office to discuss the events of that night. Pendergast explains everything in great detail: the Kothoga legend claimed that Mbwun was given to them by Satan in order to slay their enemies in battle, when in actuality, the Kothoga created the Mbwun by feeding a human the strange plant that Whittlesey had discovered and shipped back to the museum. Eating the plant resulted in the human subject's undergoing the transformation process into the creature known as Mbwun, larger, faster, stronger, and slightly smarter. However, the Mbwun subsequently needed a consistent supply of the plant in order to survive, like an addictive drug. When the tepui where the Kothoga and Mbwun lived was completely destroyed, the Mbwun knew the last surviving samples of the plant were in the crates Whittlesey had shipped back, and thus, it followed the crates all the way to New York. It initially lived off the plants in a steady ration for years, and in the process, killed Montague one day when he came down to investigate the crates. Montague's disappearance was marked by a puddle of blood by the crates, but when it was discovered by Cuthbert, Wright, and Rickman, they washed it away to preserve the museum's reputation. As part of the cover-up, the crates were moved into the heavily fortified vault, rendering them permanently inaccessible to the Mbwun. Thus, in order to stay alive, it needed the next best substitute: the human hypothalamus. Though it tried its best to keep its existence a secret by living off smaller animals and homeless people in the sewers, it eventually turned to the murders of the boys and the security guard. Even during the police investigation, it could no longer deny its appetite, and thus ran amok during the exhibition. Pendergast also reveals that among the bodies that were found in the lair were the remains of Moriarty and a pendant that Whittlesey had always worn on him, serving as proof that the creature killed both of them. Cuthbert has since been institutionalized, Coffey was demoted and sent to the Waco field office, and Smithback reveals that he will release a book on the entire event, with half of the money going to a memorial fund for the late Bailey and his family.

In his lab, Kawakita has realized a horrific truth; the creature didn't kill Whittlesey and take his pendant as a trophy, it actually was Whittlesey. He speculates that the Kothoga, having failed with Mbwun using their own people, had decided to feed the plant to a white man instead, hoping the resulting creature would be easier to control. The gamble failed, and Whittlesey was able to survive on the plants for years before their destruction, and he later followed his own samples back home to the museum. Thanks to the samples that survived and were analyzed, Kawakita manages to develop a drug that would turn the users first into addicts, then into Mbwun itself. He begins selling it on the street, reflecting that the Kothoga's problem had been that Mbwun was able to feed on the plants himself whenever he wanted, and thus they had no hold over it. Now, as the only person alive capable of making the drug, the creatures would never turn on him; he would have total control over the creatures and succeed where the Kothoga failed.

Characters

Major characters 
 NYPD Lieutenant Vincent D'Agosta, a police officer working to solve the murders
 Margo Green, a graduate student working at the museum
 Dr. Frock, Green's advisor and department head at the museum
 William Smithback, Jr., an ambitious journalist who is writing a book about the exhibition for the museum
 Special Agent Aloysius X. L. Pendergast, a secretive and highly resourceful FBI special agent
 George Moriarty, the curator of the Superstition exhibit.

Minor characters 
Dr. Ian Cuthbert, deputy head of the museum.
Gregory Kawakita, he eventually discovers what/who Mbwun really is. 
Julian Whittlesey, the principle antagonist.
Lavinia Rickman, the chief of public relations.
Ippolito, the director of security at the museum.
John Bailey, an NYPD officer.
Special Agent Spencer Coffey, an FBI agent.

Sequel novel 
Relic was followed by the bestselling sequel, Reliquary (1997)
Aloysius Pendergast, who is introduced in Relic, also appears in several of Preston's and Child's following novels, along with Smithback, Green, and D'Agosta.

Film adaptation 

A film based on the book was released in 1997, but changed several aspects of the story, omitting numerous characters and changing the setting to the Chicago Museum of Natural History rather than the New York Museum of Natural History (fictional but strongly based on the American Museum of Natural History).  The film was directed by Peter Hyams and stars Penelope Ann Miller as Dr. Margo Green, Tom Sizemore as Lt. Vincent D'Agosta, and Linda Hunt as Dr. Ann Cuthbert.

Changes from the novel 
The film gives away key plot points throughout its duration; in contrast, in the novel, the explanation is delivered in the last few pages, giving the book a twist ending. The movie has a similar twist during its climax. The following table details additional changes.

See also
Altered States
The Crate

References

External links
 Relic page from Preston & Child's official web site
 
 Relic (all editions) at WorldCat.org

1995 American novels
Eco-thriller novels
Novels by Douglas Preston
Novels by Lincoln Child
Collaborative novels
Novels about museums
Techno-thriller novels
American thriller novels
Novels set in New York City
American novels adapted into films
American Museum of Natural History
Novels set in the 1980s
Tor Books books